Amelia Maughan (born 16 May 1996) is a British swimmer and double Commonwealth Games medallist. She competed for England in the 4 × 200 metre freestyle relay and 4 × 100 metre freestyle relay at the 2014 Commonwealth Games where she won a silver and bronze medal, respectively.

References

External links 

 
 
 
 
 

1996 births
Living people
Commonwealth Games bronze medallists for England
British female swimmers
Swimmers at the 2014 Commonwealth Games
Swimmers at the 2014 Summer Youth Olympics
Commonwealth Games medallists in swimming
English female freestyle swimmers
20th-century English women
21st-century English women
People educated at Millfield
Medallists at the 2014 Commonwealth Games